Kavala B.C. is a Greek professional basketball club that is located in Kavala, Greece. The club is also known as E.K. Kavalas, with the club's full name being Enosi Kalathosfairisis Kavalas, which means Kavala Basketball Union. The club competes in the 2nd-tier level Greek A2 Basket League.

Club branding

History
Kavala B.C. was founded in 2003. In 2008, Kavala B.C. merged with Panorama B.C. to form the club Kavala B.C. (men's professional team). That same year, the merged club joined the first division of Greek pro basketball, the Greek Basket League, for the first time.

The club has played six seasons in the Greek top division (2008–09, 2009–10, 2010–11, 2011–12, 2012–13, and 2015–16). The club's best finish in the top Greek League so far is sixth place, in the 2010–11 and 2011–12 seasons.

After spending two seasons in the Greek 2nd Division, Kavala was promoted again to the top-tier Greek Basket League. During the 2015–16 season, Steve Giatzoglou, became the team's head coach, after replacing Giannis Tzimas, due to the poor performances of the club to begin the season, and in order for the club to avoid relegation. Eventually, the club was relegated anyway, after finishing in 14th place in the league.

Titles and honors
Greek 2nd Division
Champions (1): 2014–15

Roster

Notable players

Head coaches
  Vangelis Alexandris
  Dimitris Priftis
  Angelos Koronios
  Steve Giatzoglou

Name sponsorships
Great Shirt Sponsor: Geotech
Official Sport Clothing Manufacturer: 
Official Sponsor: Avance Rent A Car, Revoil
Academies Sponsor: NovaMed, taxydromiki.gr

External links
Kavala B.C. – Official Website 
Eurobasket.com Team Profile

2003 establishments in Greece
Basketball teams established in 2003
Basketball teams in Greece
Sport in Kavala